Prince  was a Japanese politician, cabinet minister, and Japanese Inspector-General of Korea. His wife was the daughter of Katō Hiroyuki.

Biography
Katsu Isaburō was born in Nagato Province in Chōshū Domain (present-day Yamaguchi prefecture, as the second son of samurai Katsu Kanesuke and Yamagata Toshiko, the elder sister of Yamagata Aritomo. As the latter had no children, he was adopted by Yamagata Aritomo in 1861 to carry on the family name.

After the Meiji Restoration, accompanied the Iwakura Mission to the United States and Europe, remaining in Germany for studies. On his return to Japan, he worked as a translator at the Foreign Ministry, and subsequently served on the Cabinet Legislation Bureau. He then entered the Home Ministry as served as Secretary to the governor of Aichi Prefecture before being  appointed governor of Tokushima Prefecture, followed by Mie Prefecture. He was later promoted to Director of the Local Affairs Bureau within the Home Ministry, and rose to the post of Vice Minister.

In 1906, Yamagata entered the 1st Saionji administration as Minister of Communications. His chief achievement was to bring about the collapse of the Saionji administration by creating a budgetary deadlock over railroad funding at the behest of Yamagata Aritomo.

In July 1908, Yamagata was appointed to a seat in the House of Peers in the Diet of Japan.
In 1910, following the resignation of Itō Hirobumi as Resident-General of Korea, Yamagata accompanied the new Resident Sone Arasuke to Korea as Deputy Resident-General. Following the formal annexation of Korea to the Empire of Japan, Yamagata remained for the next nine years as Inspector-General of Korea, (a position equivalent to that of Deputy Governor-General), under the tenure of Governor-General Terauchi Masatake and Hasegawa Yoshimichi.  Although considered to be the leading candidate to replace Hasegawa, Yamagata was removed from office during the government reorganization following the March 1 Movement in 1919. He subsequently served as Governor-General of Kwantung Leased Territory from May 1920 to September 1922.
In 1922, after the death of his foster-father Yamagata Aritomo, he inherited the kazoku title of kōshaku (prince). Afterwards, he served on the Privy Council until his death in 1927.

Honours
From the Japanese Wikipedia article

Decorations
Order of the Sacred Treasure, Third Class (27 December 1902; Fourth Class: 28 December 1898; Fifth Class: 26 June 1897; Sixth Class: 21 June 1895)
Grand Cordon of the Order of the Rising Sun (21 July 1909; Second Class: 1 April 1906)
Grand Cordon of the Order of the Rising Sun with Paulownia Flowers (24 September 1927; posthumous)

References

External links

 National Diet Library Bio and Photo

|-

Government ministers of Japan
1858 births
1927 deaths
Governors of Aichi Prefecture
Governors of Tokushima Prefecture
Japanese colonial governors and administrators
Members of the House of Peers (Japan)
Kazoku
People of Meiji-period Japan
People of the Kwantung Leased Territory
People from Yamaguchi Prefecture
People from Chōshū domain
Recipients of the Order of the Plum Blossom